

Works published
L'autr' ier al gai tems de Pascor, a pastorela by Joan Esteve

Births
 Dnyaneshwar (died 1296), Maharashtran saint, poet, philosopher and yogi
 Manuel Philes (died 1345), Byzantine
 Robert Mannyng (died 1338), English monk, writing in Middle English, French and Latin
 Musō Soseki (died 1351), Rinzai Zen Buddhist monk and teacher, and a calligraphist, poet and garden designer

Deaths
 Fujiwara no Tameie (born 1198), Japanese poet
 John of Howden, English canon and poet writing in Norman French and Latin

13th-century poetry
Poetry